Dolichoderus niger is a species of ant in the genus Dolichoderus. Described by Crawley in 1922, the species is endemic to Australia, and can be seen in scrub like habitats in Western Australia, and has been observed in native woodland around the city of Perth.

References

Dolichoderus
Hymenoptera of Australia
Insects described in 1922